This is a list of the Norway national football team results from 2020 to the present day.

2020s

2020

2021

2022

Notes

References

External links
RSSSF
Reports for all matches of Norway national team

Norway national football team results